The Rubber Research Institute of Malaysia (RRIM) is a research center for problems and matters pertaining to rubber and its industry in Malaysia.

History
On 29 June 1925, the bill to incorporate the Rubber Research Institute of Malaya was passed by the government. Dr G. Bryce was appointed the first Director of the institute on 26 September 1926. On 31 October 1926, its laboratory at Petaling Estate was closed down and from 1 November 1926, the institute took over the equipment of the Rubber Growers' Association. Also in 1926, the institute made a request to the government for the temporary laboratory building of the institute at Damansara Road in Selangor. The request was granted and the building was leased for five years. In 1936, the institute decided to relocate to a new building at Ampang Road. The building was officiated by Sultan Sulaiman of Selangor on 22 April 1936 and the institute restarted its operation on 19 May 1937.

See also
 Agriculture in Malaysia

References

1925 establishments in British Malaya
Agricultural research institutes
Research institutes in Malaysia
Research institutes established in 1925
Rubber industry in Malaysia